Bernard the Lightsome (also known as of Lwówek) (ca. 1253 or 1257 – 25 April 1286) was a Duke of Lwówek (Löwenberg) since 1278 (with his brother until 1281) and Jawor (Jauer) during 1278–1281 (as a co-ruler of his brother).

He was the third son of Bolesław II the Bald, Duke of Legnica by his first wife Hedwig, daughter of Henry I, Count of Anhalt. It is not known when exactly he was born but had to happen before 1258, because seven years later he was sent to Wroclaw by his father with the Tithe to the Bishop Thomas.

Life
Bernard actively supported the policy of his father Bolesław II and his brothers, Henry V the Fat and Bolko I the Strict (for example, he participated in the victorious Battle of Stolec). After the death of his father in 1278, Henry V gave his younger brothers Bernard and Bolko I the Duchies of Lwówek (Löwenberg) and Jawor as co-rulers. However, his independent rule began only three years later, in 1281, when he and Bolko made the division of their domains and Bernard received Lwówek. Little is known about this period in Bernard's life, and the only certain fact was (according to the chronicles), that he promoted and protected knights, a common practice among medieval princes. This also maybe justified the nickname "Zwinny" (Lightsome, Clever) given to him by contemporary sources.

Bernard died unmarried and childless in 1286. He was buried in the Dominican church in Legnica, and his lands were inherited by his brother Bolko.

References

1250s births
1286 deaths
Dukes of Silesia
Piast dynasty